Jordan Lussey (born 2 November 1994) is an English professional footballer who plays as a midfielder for Marine. He has played for Liverpool, Bolton Wanderers, York City, Southport, Telford United, Chorley, Nuneaton Borough, Curzon Ashton and AFC Fylde.

Club career

Liverpool
Lussey was born in Ormskirk, Lancashire. He played for Ormskirk Cross Hall before joining Liverpool, the club he grew up supporting, in 2002. He progressed through the club's academy, before captaining the under-18 team and establishing himself in the under-21s.

Bolton Wanderers
On 26 March 2015, Lussey joined Championship club Bolton Wanderers on loan for the remainder of the 2014–15 season. He did not make any appearances in the first team, but did impress for their development squad. Lussey signed a permanent one-year contract with Bolton on 12 July 2015, which would see him initially play with the under-21 and development teams.

On 26 November 2015, Lussey joined League Two club York City on a one-month loan. He made his debut two days later as a right-back in a 5–1 home defeat to Accrington Stanley, and played 68 minutes before being substituted for George Swan. At the end of 2015–16, Bolton confirmed that he would be leaving when his contract expired at the end of June 2016.

Southport
In September 2016, Lussey signed for National League club Southport.

A.F.C. Telford United
He signed for National League North club A.F.C. Telford United on 8 August 2017. He left the club at the end of 2017–18.

Chorley
In September 2018 he joined Chorley. At the end of this spell with the club he went to Witton Albion on dual registration terms where he played three league games in December 2018.

He left his parent and dual registration clubs at the end of December 2018.

Nuneaton Borough
He then joined Nuneaton Borough at the end of December 2018 making his debut for the club on New Year's Day 2019. After three league appearances he left the club to go and speak to clubs in Asia.

In March 2019 he rejoined Nuneaton.

Marine
In November 2019 he returned to Merseyside, signing for Marine. He left the club at the end of the season, seeking to play at a higher level.

AFC Fylde
He then signed for AFC Fylde.

Curzon Ashton
He signed for Curzon Ashton in 2021.

Return to Marine
Lussey returned to Marine in August 2022.

International career
Lussey made his debut for the England national under-18 team on 16 November 2011 as a half-time substitute for Max Clayton in a 1–1 away draw with Slovakia. His second and last cap came on 7 March 2012 after starting a 3–0 home win over Poland, in which he was substituted for Jack Dunn on 61 minutes.

Career statistics

References

External links

1994 births
Living people
People from Ormskirk
Sportspeople from Lancashire
English footballers
England youth international footballers
Association football midfielders
Liverpool F.C. players
Bolton Wanderers F.C. players
York City F.C. players
Southport F.C. players
AFC Telford United players
English Football League players
National League (English football) players
Chorley F.C. players
Nuneaton Borough F.C. players
Witton Albion F.C. players
Marine F.C. players
AFC Fylde players
Curzon Ashton F.C. players